The Lapa oil field is a deepwater oil field in the pre-salt Guaratiba Group of the South Atlantic Santos Basin,  off the coast of São Paulo, Brazil. When the discovery of the field was initially reported, it caused widespread commotion because of the speculated size of the field, which surpassed the Mexican Cantarell Complex, the biggest oil field complex outside of the Middle East. The size of Lapa, then known as Carioca and later as Sugar Loaf, was announced as possibly "as large as ".

The field was taken into production in December 2016 and is operated by Petrobras with BG and Repsol-Sinopec as partners.

History 

The field was formerly known as Carioca, named after the demonym for people from Rio de Janeiro, and later renamed to Pão de Açúcar (Sugar Loaf), after the iconic Sugarloaf Mountain of the city. Being discovered in the pre-salt of the Santos Basin after the giant Tupi oil field (2007), then called Tupi, and just before Júpiter in January 2008, the first reports about the reserves caused high expectations. It was speculated and released to the press by a spokesman of the Brazilian national petroleum agency, Agência Nacional do Petróleo (ANP), that "the field could contain reserves as large as " of oil, which would make it the biggest discovery in 30 years and one of the largest oil fields worldwide, the biggest outside of the Middle East, surpassing the Cantarell Complex of the Gulf of Mexico and the Bolivar Coastal Field of the Venezuelan oil belt.

The operator of the field, state oil company Petrobras, refuted this statement as it was "far too early" to know the size of the field while the first appraisal well Sugar Loaf-1 was still drilling. The oil price plummeted after the announcement of the discovery. The excitement about Carioca has been mentioned as an example of "oil fever" in the exploration of the Brazilian deepwater pre-salt plays.

Reservoir 

The reservoir of the Lapa oil field is the pre-salt Guaratiba Group, a Hauterivian to Aptian sequence of limestones and clastic sediments of which the microbialite, stromatolite-like limestone hosts vast amounts of oil. The sediments were deposited in half-grabens in the early stage of the basin evolution, with the Early Cretaceous opening of the South Atlantic caused by the break-up of Gondwana.

See also 

 Campos Basin
 Iara oil field
 Iracema oil field
 Sapinhoá oil field

References

Bibliography 
 
 

Oil fields of Brazil
Santos Basin
Petrobras oil and gas fields